Anthela is a genus of moths of the family Anthelidae. The genus was erected by Francis Walker in 1855.

Species
 Anthela achromata
 Anthela acuta - common anthelid moth
 Anthela addita
 Anthela adriana
 Anthela allocota
 Anthela angiana
 Anthela ariprepes
 Anthela asciscens
 Anthela astata
 Anthela asterias
 Anthela barnardi
 Anthela basigera
 Anthela binotata
 Anthela brunneilinea
 Anthela callileuca
 Anthela callispila
 Anthela callixantha
 Anthela canescens
 Anthela centralistrigata
 Anthela charon
 Anthela clementi
 Anthela cnecias
 Anthela connexa
 Anthela decolor
 Anthela deficiens
 Anthela denticulata
 Anthela ekeikei
 Anthela euryphrica
 Anthela excellens
 Anthela exoleta
 Anthela ferruginosa
 Anthela guenei
 Anthela habroptila
 Anthela heliopa
 Anthela hyperythra
 Anthela inconstans
 Anthela inornata
 Anthela limonea
 Anthela linearis
 Anthela linopepla
 Anthela maculosa
 Anthela neurospasta
 Anthela nicothoe - urticating anthelid
 Anthela ocellata - eyespot anthelid
 Anthela ochroptera
 Anthela odontogrammata
 Anthela oressarcha
 Anthela ostra
 Anthela phaeodesma
 Anthela phoenicias
 Anthela postica
 Anthela protocentra
 Anthela pudica
 Anthela pyrrhobaphes
 Anthela reltoni
 Anthela repleta
 Anthela roberi
 Anthela rosea
 Anthela rubeola
 Anthela rubescens
 Anthela rubicunda
 Anthela rubriscripta
 Anthela serranotata
 Anthela stygiana
 Anthela subfalcata
 Anthela tetraphrica
 Anthela trisecta
 Anthela unisigna
 Anthela varia - variable anthelid or hairy mary caterpillar
 Anthela virescens
 Anthela xantharcha
 Anthela xanthocera

Status unknown
 Anthela julia Hulstaert, 1924
 Anthela lineosa (Walker, 1862)
 Anthela xanthobapta Lower

References

Anthelidae